Isabel M. Montoya Atencio (1899–1996) was a San Ildefonso Pueblo painter and potter.

Biography 
Isabel M. Montoya was in 1899 and was the daughter of Nicolassa Peña Montoya and Juan Cruz Montoya. Her cousin was potter Maria Martinez. Her siblings included Rayita Montoya, Santana Montoya, and Alfredo Montoya (the first husband of Tonita Roybal).

Montoya married Benjamin Atencio circa 1925 and had five children, all of whom were painters or potters: Tony, Gilbert Benjamin, Pat, Helen Gutierrez and Angelita Sanchez.

She studied at the Santa Fe Indian School, and is known for her pencil and crayon sketches, and her role in the development of pottery in San Ildefonso.

See also 

 List of Native American artists

References

External links 
 Isabel Montoya artwork and photographs at Marie & Julian Pottery

20th-century American painters
20th-century indigenous painters of the Americas
Native American painters
Pueblo artists
Painters from New Mexico
Native American potters
Native American women artists
1899 births
1996 deaths
20th-century Native Americans
20th-century Native American women
American women painters